Secret Valentine EP is the second EP by American rock band We the Kings. It was released on December 16, 2008.

Track listing

References

External links

Secret Valentine EP at YouTube (streamed copy where licensed)

We the Kings EPs
2008 EPs